Räfven is a Swedish gypsy punk band from Gothenburg, Sweden, performing original music influenced by Eastern European folk music and the klezmer tradition. The group was formed in 2003, as a reaction against the war in Iraq.

Line-up

Current 
 Rasmus Blanck – double bass, electric bass, mandolin, tenor horn, pump organ (2005–present)
 Johan Dahlkvist – accordion
 David Fraenckel – trombone, trumpet, tenor horn (2004–present)
 Jonas Lundberg – acoustic guitar, electric guitar, mandolin
 Martin Nurmi – alto saxophone, flute
 Loke Nyberg – violin
 Per Svenner – drums and percussion (2006–present)
 Daniel Wejdin – Bulgarian tambura

Former
Marcus Berg – percussion (2003–2006)

Discography

Swedish releases 
 Live! - 3 March 2007
 "Next time we take your instruments!" – 9 April 2008 (SwingKids)
 Välkommen till Räfvbygden – 9 April 2009 (SwingKids)
 Svensk Kultur – 26 September 2011 (Räfven Records)
 Bring back the dinos – 27 May 2015 (Räfven Records)

Japanese releases 
 Welcome to Foxshire – 4 July 2009 (UncleOwen)
 Next time we take your instruments!" + Live in Gothenburg, 2 CD special edition – 3 November 2009 (UncleOwen)
 Svensk Kultur – 10 August 2011 (UncleOwen)

Concerts and music festivals
Within Sweden, Räfven has performed at the Urkult folk music festival, and given concerts around Sweden. The band has also appeared at international festivals including the Glastonbury Festival in 2008 and 2010, and the Fuji Rock Festival 2009, where they gave eight performances.

Film 
The documentary "Räfven – The band who had a manifesto" premiered at the 31st Göteborg International Film Festival in January 2008.
The band features in the closing scene of the film "För min skuld" premiered at the 34th Göteborg International Film Festival in January 2011.

References

External links 
 Official website

Swedish musical groups
Gypsy punk groups